The 1991 Men's Ice Hockey World Championships was the 55th such event sanctioned by the International Ice Hockey Federation (IIHF), and at the same time served as the 66th and last Ice Hockey European Championships. Teams representing 25 countries participated in several levels of competition. The competition also served as qualifications for group placements in the 1992 competition.

The top Championship Group A tournament took place in Finland from 19 April to 4 May 1991, with games played in Turku, Helsinki and Tampere. Eight teams took part, with each team playing each other once. The four best teams then played each other once more. Sweden became world champions for the fifth time, and the Soviet Union won their 27th European title. In the European Championships, only matches between European teams in the first round were counted towards scoring.

There were three significant 'lasts' in this year's championships. This would be the last year that a separate European title would be awarded, which the Soviets captured in their last appearance before the dissolution of the Soviet Union seven months later. Their position in Group A would be inherited by Russia, while newly independent former Soviet member states Belarus, Estonia, Kazakhstan, Latvia, Lithuania, and Ukraine began play in 1993 in qualification tournaments for Group C. The tournament itself would change significantly after this year as well.  This was the last time the top level was contested by eight teams; beginning in 1992 it would expand to twelve, requiring both Groups B and C to promote four nations each.

The final round of four teams was a very tight battle, except for the United States. Getting only a tie against the last place Germans, the Americans only advanced to the final round by narrowly defeating the host Finns. The USA were easily defeated by the three other teams in the final round, but were involved in a controversial finish. The Canadians, having tied both the Swedes and the Soviets, needed to win their game against the US by five goals, then hope that the Swedes and Soviets tied, ensuring Canada the gold. Winning 7–4 in the final minute, and despite playing short-handed, they scored the two goals they needed. American coach Tim Taylor, trailing 9–4, pulled his goalie in the final minute, later claiming that he was trying to score the necessary number of goals to win the bronze medal. It was the last of many questionable finishes over the years that hastened the IIHF to change the format of the tournament.

The Soviets and Swedes took a 1–1 tie into the third period of the last game, which would have given the gold medal to Canada had it held up. However, Mats Sundin scored at 9:37, and the Swedes held on to capture gold.

World Championship Group A (Finland)

First round

Final Round

Consolation round

No team was relegated because of the expansion to twelve teams.

World Championship Group B (Yugoslavia)
Played in Ljubljana, Bled and Jesenice 28 March to 7 April.  With the expansion of Group A impending, promotion was available to the top four finishers.  As well, the top three qualified directly for the Olympics, with fourth place needing to defeat the winner of Group C.

Italy, Norway, France, and Poland all were promoted to Group A, no one was relegated.

World Championship Group C (Denmark)
Played in Brøndby 23 March to 3 April.  With the expansion of Group A, four openings in Group B were available.  In addition, the winner got to play off for the last Olympic spot against the fourth place Group B finisher.

Denmark, China, Romania and Bulgaria were all promoted.  With no Group D in existence at this time, there was no relegation.

Ranking and statistics

Tournament Awards
Best players selected by the directorate:
Best Goaltender:       Markus Ketterer
Best Defenceman:       Jamie Macoun
Best Forward:          Valeri Kamensky
Media All-Star Team:
Goaltender:  Sean Burke
Defence:  Viacheslav Fetisov,  Alexei Kasatonov
Forwards:  Valeri Kamensky,  Jari Kurri,  Thomas Rundqvist

Final standings
The final standings of the tournament according to IIHF:

European championships final standings
The final standings of the European championships according to IIHF:

Scoring leaders
List shows the top skaters sorted by points, then goals.
Source:

Leading goaltenders
Only the top five goaltenders, based on save percentage, who have played 50% of their team's minutes are included in this list.
Source:

Citations

References
Complete results

IIHF Men's World Ice Hockey Championships
Men
World
1991
April 1991 sports events in Europe
May 1991 sports events in Europe
International sports competitions in Helsinki
1990s in Helsinki
Sports competitions in Tampere
International sports competitions in Turku
1990s in Turku
March 1991 sports events in Europe
Sports competitions in Ljubljana
1990–91 in Yugoslav ice hockey
1991 in Slovenian sport
International ice hockey competitions hosted by Yugoslavia
International ice hockey competitions hosted by Denmark
1990–91 in Danish ice hockey
Sport in Bled
Sport in Jesenice, Jesenice